Warner Bros.' library of Oscar-nominated cartoons were showcased in a DVD set on Warner Home Video of February 12, 2008 that included their own Looney Tunes and Merrie Melodies, as well as Tom and Jerry, Droopy, and other classic MGM cartoons, together with entries from Max Fleischer's Popeye and Superman series (both originally released by Paramount Pictures). All cartoons selected for this release were nominated for the Academy Award for Best Animated Short Film, with the exception of the film So Much for So Little, which won the Academy Award for Documentary Short Subject. A total of 41 cartoons (completely uncut and unedited) were chosen for this set, 15 of them being Oscar winners.

Many of the Looney Tunes/Merrie Melodies shorts featured on this collection have also been released on the Looney Tunes Golden Collection DVD sets, but this set includes a handful of others. The cartoons A Wild Hare and Hiawatha's Rabbit Hunt, which were previously reissued as Blue Ribbons, have their full original titles restored, the latter having its original titles first restored on the 1995 Turner print. The cartoon From A to Z-Z-Z-Z, previously released as a Blue Ribbon but retaining its full slate of credits, is shown here in its original format. All the Tom and Jerry shorts have been previously released on the Spotlight Collections, but most of them here are presented restored and remastered, previous copies, as for Mouse Trouble and Quiet Please!, being poor transfers of Turner broadcast TV prints. Three MGM cartoons, Touché, Pussy Cat!, Good Will to Men, and One Droopy Knight, are presented in their original Cinemascope aspect ratios.

To this day, this is Warner's only DVD release of classic animation to feature a variety of different cartoon studios. Warner has also released each of the discs separately.

Disc 1
All 15 cartoons on this disc won Academy Awards

Special Features

Audio Bonuses
 Music-only tracks
Speedy Gonzales
The Dot and the Line
 Audio Commentaries
Mark Kausler on Quiet Please!
Eric Goldberg on The Cat Concerto and The Dot and the Line
Greg Ford on For Scent-imental Reasons
Jerry Beck on So Much for So Little

Disc 2
All 14 cartoons on this disc were nominated for Academy Awards, but did not win

(*): Original opening title card restored for this release, as the releases in The Golden Age of Looney Tunes and Looney Tunes Golden Collection: Volume 3 borrowed the opening title card for A Gander at Mother Goose

Special Features

Audio Bonuses
Audio Commentaries
Jerry Beck, Leslie Cabarga, Ray Pointer and Bob Jacques on Popeye the Sailor Meets Sindbad the Sailor
Greg Ford on Peace on Earth and A Wild Hare
Mark Kausler on Puss Gets the Boot
Paul Dini on Superman
Eric Goldberg on Blitz Wolf
Jerry Beck on Walky Talky Hawky

Disc 3
All 12 cartoons on this disc were nominated for Academy Awards, but did not win

Special Features

Audio Bonuses
Music-only tracks
Little Johnny Jet
Touché, Pussy Cat!
Tabasco Road
One Droopy Knight
Vocal Chorus section isolated audio track presented by Greg Ford
Good Will to Men
Audio Commentaries
Amid Amidi on From A to Z-Z-Z-Z and Now Hear This

Bonus Cartoon
What's Cookin' Doc? (USA Turner print)

Documentary
Drawn for Glory: Animation's Triumph at the Oscars

Looney Tunes home video releases